Thomas Orral Humphrey (April 3, 1880 - August 12, 1929) was an American silent film actor and director.

Humphrey was born in Louisville, Kentucky. He starred in 46 films between 1914 and 1929 and is credited for directing four films. His younger sister Ola Humphrey was an actress.

Humphrey's first film was one of the most popular of 1915, The Diamond from the Sky in which he starred alongside Lottie Pickford, Charlotte Burton, Jack Hoxie, and other popular actors.

He died in 1929 aged 49 in Los Angeles, California.

Selected filmography
 Under the Crescent (1915)
 The Diamond from the Sky (1915) 
 Beauty and the Rogue (1918)
 The Midnight Man (1919)
 All of a Sudden Peggy (1920)
 Huckleberry Finn (1920)
 Broadway Madness (1927)
In Old California  (1929)

External links

 

1880 births
1929 deaths
American male film actors
American male silent film actors
20th-century American male actors
Male actors from Louisville, Kentucky
American film directors